Fuga is an island in the municipality of Aparri, Cagayan, Philippines.

Fuga may also refer to:

 Nissan Fuga, a full-size sedan
 Fuga (film), a 2006 Argentine-Chilean drama film
 Fuga (mantis), a genus of praying mantises
 Fuga: Melodies of Steel, a 2021 video game

People with the surname
 Lodovico Fuga (1643–1722), Italian Baroque composer 
 Ferdinando Fuga (1699–1782), Italian architect
 Myqerem Fuga, Albanian politician
 Tani Fuga (born 1973), Samoan rugby union player
 Endri Fuga (born 1981), Albanian government spokesman
 Paula Fuga, Hawaiian singer-songwriter

See also
 Fugue (disambiguation)
 La Fuga (disambiguation)
 En Fuga, a 1994 Roy Brown studio album